Two destroyers of the Imperial Japanese Navy were named Mikazuki:

 , a  launched in 1906 and scuttled in 1930
 , a  launched in 1926 and sunk in 1943

Imperial Japanese Navy ship names
Japanese Navy ship names